Florencio Molina Campos (birth name, Florencio de los Ángeles Molina Campos, August 21, 1891 – November 16, 1959) was an Argentine illustrator and a painter known by his typical traditional scenes of the Pampa. His work represents gauchesco scenes with a bit of humor.

Biography
Molina Campos was born in Buenos Aires. His first exhibition was at the Central Hall of the Argentine Rural Society, in 1926. Marcelo Torcuato de Alvear, the President of Argentina at that time, named him art teacher of the "Colegio Nacional Avellaneda" after seeing the exhibition.

In 1930, the Alpargatas company, makers of espadrilles, under the supervision of engineer Luis Pastorino, commissioned 12 illustrations (using gouache technique) from him for their 1931 calendar. These were so successful that Molina Campos continued to provide the drawings for the next 12 years. In 1942 he exhibited at the Modern Art Museum of San Francisco, which following the exhibition toured the United States. In 1956 he had an exhibition at the Witcomb Gallery in Buenos Aires.

In the late 1940s until the mid-1950s he was engaged as a creative artist consulting for the studio of his long-time friend Walt Disney. Together during their trips to Bariloche they worked on the creation of characters for the 1942 animated film, Bambi. His contribution to the film can be recognized in the style of the animals and trees in the film that reproduces the wild life of Victoria Island on Nahuel Huapi Lake, in Argentina's Patagonia.

As an artistic consultant with the Disney studios he also contributed in the creation of inexpensive package films, containing collections of cartoon shorts, and issued them to theaters during this period. The most notable and successful of these were Saludos Amigos (1942), its sequel The Three Caballeros (1945), Fun and Fancy Free (1947) and in the original movie poster of Alice in Wonderland (1951).

In 1946 Molina Campos published Vida Gaucha, a text book for Spanish students in the United States. In 1950 he won the Clarín Award - gold medal in the 5th. Argentine Artists Exhibition. He also worked as actor in the short Pampa Mansa, screened in the 1956 Berlin International Film Festival which he attended as honored guest.

His latest exhibition was as a posthumous tribute in 1959.

References

External links

 Official site
 Fundación Florencio Molina Campos

People from Buenos Aires
Argentine people of Spanish descent
Argentine illustrators
1891 births
1959 deaths
20th-century Argentine painters
Argentine male painters
20th-century Argentine male artists